Oakland Alternative High School is an alternative secondary school in Tacoma, Washington. It was built in 1912 by a prominent local architectural firm and is located at 3319 South Adams Street (South End).

Campus
The school's building, designed by architect Frederick Heath and George Gove (of the Heath & Gove firm), and was built in 1912.  The school served elementary students until 1988, at which time it became a high school.  During 2009–10, approximately 250 students attended Oakland.  OHS also added a middle school component in the 2009–10 school year.

Curriculum
The curriculum at OHS is the same as any Tacoma School District's comprehensive high schools. Oakland works on a quarter system, rather than a semester system. Student earn the same number of credits at Oakland per quarter as students attending comprehensive high schools do in a semester. Oakland has a three period day vs. a six or seven period day.

References

External links
Oakland Alternative High School

Schools in Tacoma, Washington
High schools in Pierce County, Washington
Frederick Heath buildings
Public high schools in Washington (state)
Alternative schools in the United States